Road House is a 1989 American action film directed by Rowdy Herrington and starring Patrick Swayze as a cooler at a newly refurbished roadside bar who protects a small town in Missouri from a corrupt businessman. Sam Elliott co-stars as a bouncer, the mentor, friend, and foil of Swayze's character. The cast also includes Kelly Lynch as Swayze's love interest and Ben Gazzara as the main antagonist. A direct sequel, Road House 2, was released in 2006.

Plot
James Dalton is a professional "cooler" with a mysterious past who is enticed from his job in New York City by Frank Tilghman to take over security at his club, the Double Deuce, in Jasper, Missouri. Tilghman plans to invest substantial money into the club to enhance its image, and he needs a first-rate cooler to maintain stability. Handed control of all bar operations and hiring by Frank, Dalton fires multiple employees for theft and drug dealing.

Dalton is introduced to local business magnate Brad Wesley, who effectively controls the town. His henchmen threaten Tilghman, and during the ensuing struggle, Dalton receives a knife wound. At the hospital, he begins a friendship with Dr. Elizabeth "Doc" Clay, which develops into a romance. Dalton also reunites with his mentor, aging cooler Wade Garrett, who comes to town after receiving a disconcerting phone call from Dalton.

Wesley summons Dalton to his home and reveals knowledge of Dalton's past regarding an incident in which he killed a man in self-defense by ripping his throat out. Wesley tries to convince Dalton to work for him once he extorts the Double Deuce but Dalton declines. Wesley increases his attack on the club and begins to sabotage other businesses that disobey him. After Wesley's henchman Jimmy Reno sets Dalton's house on fire, he kills him in self-defense, shocking Elizabeth.

After Wesley has Garrett killed, Dalton snaps and storms Wesley's estate, killing most of his henchmen and ultimately incapacitating Wesley. As he tries to walk away, Wesley pulls a gun on him. Before Wesley can shoot, however, he is shot to death by the townspeople, who deny any knowledge of what had happened to the arriving police. In the end, the town celebrates its newfound freedom at the Double Deuce.

Cast

Production

Casting
Annette Bening was originally cast as Dr. Elizabeth Clay but she was fired because she and Patrick Swayze had too little chemistry, so she was replaced by Kelly Lynch.

Filming
Filming started in April 1988 on location throughout California, primarily in Newhall, Valencia, and Canyon Country. The filming of much of the "New Double Deuce" used Anaheim's  Cowboy bar, also later called the Bandstand among other names until it closed. The opening and monster truck scenes were filmed in Reedley, California. The Kings River runs between the two residences. The monster truck used was Bigfoot #7, which was originally built for the film. The scene cost $500,000 to film.

Music
The soundtrack for Road House featured Canadian guitarist Jeff Healey, whose band was featured in the film as the house band for the Double Deuce. Cruzados were the band in the opening credits, contributing three songs to the film that never made the soundtrack. Patrick Swayze also wrote one song and sang two for the soundtrack. The film's score was composed by Michael Kamen. A limited edition 14-track score album part of the Special Collection was issued by Intrada Records in 2012. An expanded limited 31-track score was reissued for the film's 30th anniversary by La-La Land Records in 2019.

Release

Theatrical
The film premiered in New York and Los Angeles on May 19, 1989.

Home media
Between VHS, DVD,  Blu-ray and Streaming service sales, 'Road House' has grossed over $203 million, including its original box office of $61 million. The film was originally released on VHS and then on DVD. In the United States Metro-Goldwyn-Mayer first released the film on DVD on February 4, 2003, with a 2.35:1 aspect ratio and theatrical trailer as the sole extra feature. In 2006 a Deluxe Edition DVD was released with two audio commentaries including one with the director, two featurettes titled "On the Roadhouse" and "What Would Dalton Do?". Road House was first issued by MGM on Blu-ray disc on June 2, 2009. A second disc combines the same six special features ported from the Deluxe DVD. After being reissued numerous times in the U.S., in 2016 Shout! Factory released a 2-disc Blu-ray collectors edition with fourteen extra features with material ported over from the previous editions. New supplements include a 'making of' documentary with new interviews by Herrington, actors Kelly Lynch, John Doe, Kevin Tighe, Julie Michaels and Red West, a separate conversation with the director and featurette for the film's music. The magnet clasp boxed limited edition 4K Ultra HD Blu-ray/Blu-ray combo pack from Vinegar Syndrome was released on November 25, 2022.

Reception

Box office
The film grossed $30 million in the United States and Canada and $31 million internationally for a worldwide total of $61 million. The film was more successful on home video. The film also found life on cable television.

Critical response
On Rotten Tomatoes, Road House has a rating of 39% based on 44 reviews and has an average rating of 5.2 out of 10. The consenus states: "Whether Road House is simply bad or so bad it's good depends largely on the audience's fondness for Swayze -- and tolerance for violently cheesy action."

Roger Ebert of the Chicago Sun-Times gave the film two and a half out of four stars and commented, "Road House exists right on the edge between the 'good-bad movie' and the merely bad. I hesitate to recommend it, because so much depends on the ironic vision of the viewer. This is not a good movie. But viewed in the right frame of mind, it is not a boring one, either."

When interviewed by Anthony Bourdain, Bill Murray lauded the film as unappreciated, with a complex plot and respect among actors in the film industry since its release. Kelly Lynch told The A.V. Club, "Every time Road House is on and he [Murray] or one of his idiot brothers are watching TV – and they're always watching TV – one of them calls my husband and says (in a reasonable approximation of Carl Spackler from Caddyshack), 'Kelly's having sex with Patrick Swayze right now. They're doing it. He's throwing her against the rocks.'" Murray is the best friend of Lynch's husband, Mitch Glazer, and Lynch herself considers Murray a "buddy".

Accolades
Road House was nominated for (but did not "win") five Golden Raspberry Awards: Worst Picture, Worst Actor (Patrick Swayze), Worst Supporting Actor (Ben Gazzara), Worst Director, and Worst Screenplay. The film is listed in Golden Raspberry Award founder John Wilson's book The Official Razzie Movie Guide as one of The 100 Most Enjoyably Bad Movies Ever Made.

Other media

Sequel

A sequel, Road House 2, was released directly to DVD in July 2006. Set many years later and telling the story of Dalton's adult son, it featured no characters from the original cast and only a few references to Dalton (who was reportedly shot dead before the film took place). The sequel confirmed that Dalton's first name was James, which could be seen momentarily on the medical chart in the original film's hospital scene, but which had been otherwise left unsaid. At the same time Road House 2 was released, the original film was reissued in a deluxe edition featuring, among other features, separate audio commentary tracks by director Herrington, Kevin Smith, and Scott Mosier, which the duo had expressed an interest in during the introduction of the tenth anniversary Clerks DVD.

Musical
In 2003, an off-Broadway musical production of Road House was staged as a campy comedy by Timothy Haskell, as seen by its full title of Road House: The Stage Version Of The Cinema Classic That Starred Patrick Swayze, Except This One Stars Taimak From The 80's Cult Classic "The Last Dragon" Wearing A Blonde Mullet Wig.

Police training video
Following the death of Eric Garner, the New York City Police Department began using a scene from Road House as part of a mandatory, three-day retraining course for 22,000 officers expected to "be nice" under pressure.

Remake

On September 9, 2015, it was announced that Ronda Rousey would star in a remake of Road House. On October 12, 2015, Nick Cassavetes was announced to write and direct the film. However, plans for the film fell through and the remake was quietly canceled in 2016.

In November 2021, it was reported that Jake Gyllenhaal was in talks to star in a remake of Road House by Metro-Goldwyn-Mayer with Doug Liman directing. In August 2022, a full cast was announced including Conor McGregor, Billy Magnussen, Gbemisola Ikumelo and Daniela Melchior and would debut on Amazon Prime Video. The film is rumored to have a similar plot with a modern twist. Gyllenhaal's character is to be a former UFC fighter who is now retired and working at a roadhouse in the Florida Keys. Production for the movie will begin in August 2022 and is planned to be released worldwide on Amazon Prime.

References

External links

 
 
 

1989 films
1989 action films
1989 martial arts films
1980s English-language films
American action films
Films about extortion
Films about organized crime in the United States
Films adapted into comics
Films adapted into plays
Films directed by Rowdy Herrington
Films produced by Joel Silver
Films scored by Michael Kamen
Films set in Missouri
Films shot in California
Karate films
Kung fu films
Silver Pictures films
United Artists films
1980s American films